"Poetic Justice" is a song by American rapper Kendrick Lamar, from his major-label debut studio album Good Kid, M.A.A.D City (2012). The song, produced by American record producer Scoop DeVille, features a verse from Canadian rapper Drake. The song was released as the album's fourth official single, due to its positive response.

Background
The song was produced by Scoop DeVille, who Lamar had previously worked with on his debut single "The Recipe". DeVille sampled Janet Jackson's "Any Time, Any Place." Lamar and DeVille chose to sample the record after it came on the radio during their studio session. In an interview, DeVille recalled several artists wanting the song, including American rapper 50 Cent, before he ended up giving it to Lamar. On January 26, 2013, Lamar performed the song on Saturday Night Live, as well as his previous single "Swimming Pools (Drank)."

Music video
In a December 2012 interview, Lamar stated that the music video would be filmed "soon." Although he expressed interest in having the legendary Janet Jackson herself, who starred in the 1993 film from which the song takes its name, to appear in the video, she did not make an appearance.

The music video, directed by Kendrick Lamar under the pseudonym The Lil Homie, alongside Dee.Jay.Dave and Dangeroo Kipawaa, was released February 22, 2013. The video features cameo appearances by Lamar’s fellow West Coast rappers Jay Rock, YG and Glasses Malone.

Critical reception
The song garnered critical acclaim. Reviews complimented the performances of both rappers, but most of the praise went out to the sampling of Janet Jackson's hit "Any Time, Any Place". The Irish Times complimented it as one of the best tracks from Good Kid, M.A.A.D City. MTV called the song "flawless" and one of the most anticipated collaborations of the album.

While one source has identified "Poetic Justice" as a "false empowerment anthem" for East African girls due to a line in Drake's feature, Lamar has stated in an interview how aesthetic choices for the music video's production involved recognizing the "diversity of beauty" in casting.

Remix
A freestyle over the song's instrumental was recorded and released by American rappers Busta Rhymes and Q-Tip on December 21, 2012, where the two pay homage to Janet Jackson.

Commercial performance 
The song debuted at #76 on the Billboard Hot 100 in the album's first week on sale. It has peaked at number 26 as of March 7, 2013. It also charted at #8 on Hot R&B/Hip-Hop Songs and at #6 on Hot Rap Songs. On May 9, 2013, the song was certified Gold by the RIAA.

Charts

Weekly charts

Year-end charts

Certifications

Release history

References

2012 songs
Kendrick Lamar songs
Songs written by Kendrick Lamar
Drake (musician) songs
Songs written by Drake (musician)
Songs written by Janet Jackson
2013 singles
Interscope Records singles
Aftermath Entertainment singles
Top Dawg Entertainment singles
Song recordings produced by Scoop DeVille
Songs written by Scoop DeVille
Songs written by Jimmy Jam and Terry Lewis
Music videos directed by Dave Free